Cutting in is a process, in dancing, by which a person interrupts two dance partners and claims the partner of one.  As traditionally portrayed in Hollywood films, men are more likely to cut in than women.

Dance etiquette in the 1930s stated that while a dance is in progress, a young man may "cut in" and ask the lady to finish the dance with him. If the dance has not been in progress long, and the young lady wishes to continue it with her current partner, she may nod and say "the next time we pass here". The dance continues around the room, and when the couple reach the same place again, the lady leaves her partner and finishes the dance with the young man who has "cut in".

It is common practice that if a gentlemen would like to dance with a lady who is already dancing with another man, he may cut in by approaching the dancing couple, tapping the man on the shoulder, and asking "May I cut in?"  In modern culture, it is typically  inappropriate for either member of the dancing pair to refuse the request to cut in. If the first gentlemen would like to dance with the lady again, he must wait until the next dance to ask her or cut in.

In Hollywood films, cutting in is often seen as a romantic gesture in which a man sweeps a woman off her feet. In The Sound of Music, Maria and Captain von Trapp's romance first begins to blossom when he cuts in on a dance between his son and Maria. In other cases, cutting in can add tension by interrupting a romantic moment between two protagonists. In the Disney film Enchanted, Giselle and Robert share a romantic dance, only to be cut in on by Nancy, leaving the couple longing for more time together.

See also
Money dance, a dance in which cutting in is expected

References

Dance culture
Partner dance